Omen is an American heavy metal band formed in Los Angeles in 1983 by lead guitarist Kenny Powell.

History 
The band was formed in Los Angeles, California, in 1983 by lead guitarist Kenny Powell, previously with the band Savage Grace, and signed on with Metal Blade in 1984, with whom they released their debut, Battle Cry. (It contained the song "The Axeman", which appeared on the soundtrack for the heavy metal-themed 2009 video game Brütal Legend.)

In 1985, the second album Warning of Danger followed, which built up Omen's reputation as one of the forefathers of power metal acts. In 1986, they released The Curse, their first release with major label distribution by Capitol Records in the US. In Japan the band climbed to number 14 in the Burrn! Charts.

With new singer Coburn Pharr (who would later leave to join Annihilator), the band released Escape to Nowhere in 1988; although considered a departure from the classic Omen sound, "Thorn in Your Flesh" was their first hit single in the US.

In 1996, they signed with new label Massacre Records and toured Europe with Fates Warning for the first time. In October 2003, their former singer, J.D. Kimball, died, having succumbed to cancer after three years of treatment.

Currently, Omen has released seven studio albums worldwide, and a 20th anniversary box set. The release Hammer Damage has been delayed for more than eight years and was released in 2016 via DSN Music.

Members

Current lineup 
 Nikos Migus A. – vocals (2017-present)
 Kenny Powell – guitar (1983–1989, 1996-present)
 Roger Sisson – bass (2017-present)
 Reece Stanley – drums (2017-present)

Previous members 
 J.D. Kimball – vocals (1983–1987; died 2003)
 Coburn Pharr – vocals (1987–1989)
 Greg Powell – vocals, guitar (1996–1998)
 Kevin Goocher – vocals (1998–2009, 2014–2017)
 George Call – vocals (2009–2011)
 Matt Story – vocals (2011–2014)
 Jody Henry – bass (1983–1989)
 Andy Haas – bass (1996–2005, 2009–2017)
 Scott Clute – bass (2005–2007)
 Glenn Malicki – bass (2007–2009)
 Steve Wittig – drums (1983–1988, 2012–2017)
 Cam Daigneault – drums (1988–1989)
 Rick Murray – drums (1996–2005)
 Danny White – drums (2005–2010)
 Wampa Zayas – drums (2010–2012)

Timeline

Discography

Studio

Live

EPs

Compilations

Box sets

Video albums

References

External links 

American power metal musical groups
Heavy metal musical groups from California
Musical groups from Los Angeles
Musical groups established in 1983